Rose Lucinda Ayling-Ellis (born 17 November 1994) is an English actress. Deaf since birth, she is a British Sign Language user. She is best known for playing the role of Frankie Lewis in the BBC soap opera EastEnders (2020–2022). 

In 2021, she became the first deaf contestant to appear on Strictly Come Dancing and, with Giovanni Pernice, won the nineteenth series. She is the recipient of the Visionary Honours for Inspirational Person of the Year.

Early life
Ayling-Ellis was born on 17 November 1994, in Hythe, Kent and grew up in Hythe. She was born deaf. As a child, she took part in a filming weekend run by the National Deaf Children's Society. During the weekend, she met deaf film director Ted Evans, who later cast her in his award-winning short film The End. She then applied to Deafinitely Youth Theatre.

Career
Ayling-Ellis's first role was in a short film called The End directed by deaf filmmaker Ted Evans. The 25-minute short is summarised as: "Starting in the 1980s, The End follows four deaf children over 60 years."

She has taken part in a number of stage productions, including Mother Courage (Royal Exchange Theatre, Manchester); Faith, Hope And Charity R&D (National Theatre, London) and Herons Workshop (Lyric Hammersmith, London). Her television credits include Summer of Rockets and Casualty. She appeared in The Vamps music video for "Middle of the Night", and in the short film Almost with Vilma Jackson. Since 2020, Ayling-Ellis has been playing Frankie Lewis in the BBC soap opera EastEnders. Her character was originally written by the deaf journalist and scriptwriter Charlie Swinbourne. Her departure from the series was announced in August 2022, with her final scenes set to air in the autumn.

In 2021, Ayling-Ellis became the first deaf contestant on BBC's Strictly Come Dancing. She participated in and won the show's nineteenth series, with professional Giovanni Pernice. In an interview before the start of the series, she said:  Ayling-Ellis and Pernice scored 40 (full marks) for their tango in week six, which was the earliest "perfect score" in the show's history. In week eight, their Couple's Choice dance featured a period of silence, included as a tribute to the deaf community. Described by judge Anton Du Beke as "the greatest thing I've ever seen on the show", it earned them the 2021 Heat Unmissables Award for TV Moment of the Year. It also won the British Academy Television Award for Virgin TV's Must-See Moment in 2022.

In May 2022, Ayling-Ellis became the first celebrity to sign a bedtime story on CBeebies. In August 2022, she unveiled the first deaf Barbie doll equipped with behind-the-ear hearing aids as part of the campaign Rose, Barbie and Friends, which includes a number of diverse dolls; Ayling-Ellis worked with Mattel during the production of the doll.

Personal life
In an interview with the National Deaf Children's Society, Ayling-Ellis explained that she often has to perform using Sign-supported English (SSE) to reflect her own communication style and make it clear to audiences. Her deafness has not stopped her from enjoying music, and she told The Guardian that her favourite artists are Dolly Parton and Stevie Wonder, and that she is a big fan of soul music.
Ayling-Ellis was in a relationship with Samuel Arnold from 2014 until 2022.

Filmography

Stage

Awards and nominations

References

External links
 
 

1994 births
Living people
21st-century English actresses
BSL users
Deaf actresses
English deaf people
English soap opera actresses
English stage actresses
English television actresses
People from Hythe, Kent
Strictly Come Dancing winners